The Acer beTouch E200 (also known as Acer L1 ) is a smartphone manufactured by Acer Inc. of Taiwan. It runs Windows Mobile 6.5 operating system and it was released in October 2009.

Main features

If beTouch E200 runs Windows Mobile 6.5. It has a 3 megapixel camera and an A-GPS module comes with Google Maps. It lacks of Wi-Fi capability.

 3G +
 TFT touch screen 3''240 x 320 pixels
 Touch interface UI 3.0 Acer
 Sliding alphanumeric keypad
 AFN 3 megapixels
 A-GPS module
 512 MB internal memory + microSD Memory Card
 RAM 256 MB
 Qualcomm 528 MHz processor
 Bluetooth 2.0 EDR
 Windows Mobile 6.5
 3G talk time up to 5h
 Dimensions 110 x 53.5 x 15.4 mm
 weight 146 g
 1140 mAh Lithium-ion Battery

References

External links
 Acer Smartphones Website
 Acer beTouch E200 Site

beTouch E200
Windows Mobile Professional devices
Mobile phones introduced in 2009